Fabienne Colboc (born 9 August 1971) is a French politician representing La République En Marche!. She was elected to the French National Assembly on 18 June 2017, representing the department of Indre-et-Loire.

Early life and career
Colboc holds a degree in sociology and also runs a professional coaching business.

Political career
In parliament, Colboc serves on the Committee on Cultural Affairs and Education. In addition to her committee assignments, she is part of the French-Portuguese Parliamentary Friendship Group.

In July 2019, Colboc decided not to align with her parliamentary group's majority and became one of 52 LREM members who abstained from a vote on the French ratification of the European Union’s Comprehensive Economic and Trade Agreement (CETA) with Canada.

External links
 Her page on the National Assembly website

References

1971 births
Living people
People from Thiais
Deputies of the 15th National Assembly of the French Fifth Republic
Women members of the National Assembly (France)
La République En Marche! politicians
21st-century French women politicians
Deputies of the 16th National Assembly of the French Fifth Republic